Joanne Duncan is the name of:

 Joanne Duncan (politician) (born 1959), Australian politician
 Joanne Duncan (athlete) (born 1966), English shot putter